The 1799 Tennessee gubernatorial election took place from August 1–2, 1799. The Democratic-Republican incumbent John Sevier won another term almost unanimously against scattering opponents.

Results

References

1799 Tennessee elections
1799
Tennessee